Kosovo Pomoravlje ( / Kosovsko Pomoravlje, "Pomoravlje of Kosovo"), or Anamorava, is a valley in Kosovo, in the southern part of the District of Gjilan surrounding the Binačka Morava River. It stretches eastward to the Preševo Valley in southern Serbia. Gjilan, Kamenica, Novo Brdo and Viti are municipalities located in the region. The region gave its name to Kosovo-Pomoravlje District, which largely corresponds to its successor District of Gjilan in Kosovo. It is known for recording the lowest temperature in Kosovo: , on 25 January 1963.

Name 
Its name is derived from the Binačka Morava river, which flows through northern North Macedonia, eastern Kosovo and southern Serbia as part of the Great Morava river system.

Geography
Kosovo-Pomoravlje District was a district of Serbia until 1999. After the United Nations Interim Administration Mission in Kosovo took control in 1999, it was transformed into the District of Gjilan. It is bordered by the Skopska Crna Gora mountains in the south and the Goljak in the north, and borders Kosovo field in the west. On the east, it borders the Morava Valley. The region's largest city is Gjilan.

The region can be divided into Lower Kosovo Pomoravlje and Upper Kosovo Pomoravlje, which is also part of the Skopska Crna Gora region.

The region includes part of the valley and the Skopska Crna Gora region and Koznik mountains. Gjilan has six municipalities and 287 smaller settlements. The spa in Klokot has several thermal springs valued for their medicinal qualities.

Climate 

Rainfall is light, and winter often brings rain and wet snow from the north; southern and southwestern winds tend to bring warm, dry weather.

Hydrography

Tributaries of the Morava river system include the Karadak and Lapušnica rivers. The Preševo Valley is a corridor between the Morava and Vardar valleys, and the Morava valley's wetlands are home to many species of birds.

Infrastructure

Transportation
Rail traffic passes through the valley near the tributaries.

Notes

References

Bibliography

External links 

Geographical regions of Kosovo